"The Slightest Touch" is a 1987 single by the British pop group Five Star. It reached No. 4 in the UK singles chart, becoming the group's final Top 10 hit to date.

Taken from their second album, Silk & Steel, Five Star chose legendary remixer Shep Pettibone to remix the album track for release as a single.

Track listings
7" vinyl
 "The Slightest Touch" (Shep Pettibone 7" Mix) [Michael Jay, Marvin Morrow] 4.20
 "Stone Court" [Stedman Pearson] 3.46

7" vinyl box set with 2 x 7" singles
 "The Slightest Touch" (Shep Pettibone 7" Mix)
 "Stone Court"

 "Hide and Seek" (7" Edit)
 "Crazy"

12" vinyl
 "The Slightest Touch" (The Pettibone Touch Remix) 6.27 *
 "The Slightest Touch" (House Touch) 6.27
 "Stone Court" 3:46
 "The Slightest Touch" (Slightest Dub) 6:16

Cassette single
 "The Slightest Touch" (Shep Pettibone 7" Mix)
 "Find the Time" (Shep Pettibone Remix-Part 1)
 "Stone Court"
 "If I Say Yes" (Lew Hahn New York Remix) **

All tracks available on the remastered versions of either the 2010 'Silk & Steel' album, the 2013 'The Remix Anthology (The Remixes 1984-1991)' or the 2018 'Luxury - The Definitive Anthology 1984-1991' boxset EXCEPT ** "If I Say Yes" (Lew Hahn New York Remix) - only available on this cassette.

 Also the version of "The Slightest Touch" (The Pettibone Touch Remix) on the 2010 Expanded Edition of Silk & Steel (CRPOP74) has a slight mastering error at the beginning of this pressing.

Charts

Steps version

British group Steps released a version of "The Slightest Touch" as the third single from their seventh studio album, What the Future Holds Pt. 2. The cover was announced on 19 August 2021 via the band's  Instagram account.

In a statement, the band said "We are such massive fans of Five Star, when we started brainstorming a possible cover idea to include on What the Future Holds Pt. 2 this felt like the natural choice. They are absolute idols of ours and have always dreamed about giving one of their songs a euphoric Steps makeover". Five Star gave the cover their seal of approval, saying Steps had "nailed" the song and they loved the band's take on it.

Track listing

Digital EP
 "The Slightest Touch" - 3:27
 "Take Me for a Ride" (Single Mix) - 3:16
 "Take Me for a Ride" (Initial Talk Remix Edit) - 3:44
 "Take Me for a Ride" (Shortland Remix Edit) - 3:22
 "Take Me for a Ride" (7th Heaven Remix Edit) - 3:32
 "Take Me for a Ride" (Shortland Club Mix) - 6:12

Remixes EP
 "The Slightest Touch" - 3:27
 "The Slightest Touch" (Shortland Remix) [Edit] - 3:04
 "The Slightest Touch" (Shanghai Surprize Remix) [Edit] - 3:37
 "The Slightest Touch" (7th Heaven Extended Mix) - 6:00
 "The Slightest Touch" (Shortland Club Mix) - 6:03
 "The Slightest Touch" (Shanghai Surprize Club Mix) - 6:22

Remixes
 "The Slightest Touch" - 3:27
 "The Slightest Touch" (Shortland Remix) [Edit] - 3:04
 "The Slightest Touch" (Shanghai Surprize Remix) [Edit] - 3:37
 "The Slightest Touch" (7th Heaven Extended Mix) - 6:00
 "The Slightest Touch" (Acoustic) - 3:30
 "The Slightest Touch" (Shortland Club Mix) - 6:03
 "The Slightest Touch" (Shanghai Surprize Club Mix) - 6:22

Other versions
Karaoke Version - 3:26

Charts

Other versions
"The Slightest Touch" was covered by Louise for her compilation album Changing Faces: The Best of Louise. This version of the song was based on the album mix  and was not released as a single.

References

Five Star songs
Steps (group) songs
1986 songs
1987 singles
2021 singles
RCA Records singles
Songs written by Marvin Morrow
Songs written by Michael Margules